Elections to the Baseball Hall of Fame for 1956 followed a system that had been the object of criticism and reform in recent years, which would continue that summer.
The Veterans Committee was meeting only in odd-number years to consider older major league players as well as managers, umpires, and executives. The Baseball Writers' Association of America (BBWAA) voted by mail to select from recent players and elected two, Joe Cronin and Hank Greenberg. A formal induction ceremony was held in Cooperstown, New York, on July 23, 1956, with Commissioner of Baseball Ford Frick presiding.

Criticism and reform
Following the election, complaints by the writers that the electees were not up to the standards of previous choices, and that the eligible players included few strong candidates, led to a number of changes in the rules. Foremost among the alterations was the decision to hold future BBWAA elections only in alternating years with the Veterans Committee, and also the elimination of the rule which required writers to vote for 10 candidates; thereafter, they would be advised only to vote for up to 10.

Various factors over the previous few years had led to the voters' complaints regarding the strength of the eligible candidates. Among these were the decision in the early 1950s to extend the waiting period for eligibility following a player's retirement from one year to five years; as a result, many players who retired in the early 1950s and would otherwise have been eligible were temporarily taken out of contention. Also, many of the players who retired in the late 1940s and early 1950s had careers which were interrupted by military service during World War II, depriving them of accomplishments during those seasons which might have enhanced their qualifications in the eyes of voters. Some players returned from the war with their skills in decline after the long layoff, and retired within a few years when they might otherwise have enjoyed several productive seasons if not for the interruption in their play; in other cases, similar players who might have become more distinct with a few added seasons ended up with careers which were more difficult to distinguish. Perhaps most significantly, the Hall of Fame had instituted a rule at the beginning of the decade which was designed to ensure that the honor of selection was not exploited for profit as a mere gate attraction, and that players who were selected were not put into games long after their playing ability had waned simply to sell tickets; as a result, any individual who was still in uniform as a manager or coach – even at the minor league level – had been ruled ineligible for selection. (It is important to note that at the time, managers and coaches were widely regarded as being full members of the roster; playing managers and coaches were still very common, and even minor league managers not generally thought of as playing managers often inserted themselves into games in emergency situations.)

BBWAA election
The BBWAA was authorized to elect players active in 1926 or later, but not after 1950. All 10-year members of the BBWAA were eligible to vote.

Any candidate receiving votes on at least 75% of the ballots would be honored with induction to the Hall. Votes were cast for 106 players; a total of 193 ballots were cast, with 145 votes required for election. A total of 1,599 individual votes were cast, an average of 8.28 per ballot.

The two candidates who received 75% of the vote and were elected are indicated in bold italics; candidates who have since been elected in subsequent elections are indicated in italics.

Notes

References

External links
1956 Election at www.baseballhalloffame.org

Baseball Hall of Fame balloting
Hall of Fame balloting